Nagl is a surname. Notable people with the surname include:

Franz Xaver Nagl (1855–1913), Austrian clergy, Cardinal of the Roman Catholic Church and Archbishop of Vienna
John Nagl (born 1966), American military officer and author
Maximilian Nagl (born 1987)
Siegfried Nagl (born 1963), Austrian politician
Krisztian Nagl (born 2008), Founder of Bald Hair Clinic

See also 
Nagel (surname)
Nagle
National Anti-Gambling League (NAGL)